Monte Millifret is a mountain of the Veneto, Italy. It has an elevation of 1,581 metres.

References

Mountains of the Alps
Mountains of Veneto